The TeST TST-6 Duo is a Czech shoulder-wing, two-seats in side-by-side configuration motor glider that was designed and produced by TeST of Brno.

Design and development
The TST-6 was designed as a two-place touring motorglider. Production is complete and the aircraft is no longer available.

The TST-6 is of mixed wood and fibreglass construction. The  span forward-swept wings feature both top surface air brakes and flaps and employ a Wortmann FX 61-184 airfoil. Both the wings and tailplane are removable for transportation or storage. The landing gear is fixed tricycle gear and fits wheel pants. The engine is nose-mounted in tractor configuration and drives a three-bladed, ground adjustable, wooden-bladed propeller.

The aircraft was available as plans, a standard 400 hour construction kit, a 300-hour construction "Express-Built" kit or as factory-completed and ready-to-fly. In 1998 the factory-completed aircraft, less engine, was US$18,000. In December 2000 the complete aircraft with Rotax 582 powerplant was US$29,500, the aircraft without engine was US$21,200 and plans were US$350.

Specifications (TST-6)

See also

References

TST-6
1990s Czech and Czechoslovakian sailplanes
Homebuilt aircraft
Motor gliders
Shoulder-wing aircraft